The Hatch Act of 1887 (ch. 314, enacted 1887-03-02,  et seq.) gave federal funds, initially of $15,000 each, to state land-grant colleges in order to create a series of agricultural experiment stations, as well as pass along new information, especially in the areas of soil minerals and plant growth. The bill was named for Congressman William Hatch, who chaired the House Committee of Agriculture at the time the bill was introduced. State agricultural stations created under this act were usually connected with those land-grant state colleges and universities founded under the Morrill Act of 1862, with few exceptions.

Many stations founded under the Hatch Act later became the foundations for state cooperative extension services under the Smith–Lever Act of 1914.

Congress amended the act in 1955 to add a formula that uses rural and farm population factors to allocate the annual appropriation for agricultural experiment stations among the states. Under the 2002 farm bill (P.L. 107–171, Sec. 7212), states will continue to be required to provide at least 100% matching funds (traditionally, most states have provided more). On average, Hatch Act formula funds constitute 10% of total funding for each experiment station. (7 U.S.C. 361a et seq.).

See also
 Adams Act of 1906
 Purnell Act of 1925
 Bankhead–Jones Act of 1935
 George W. Atherton

External links
 
 
 

United States federal agriculture legislation
United States federal public land legislation
1887 in American law
49th United States Congress